The Sommerfelders, also called Sommerfeld Mennonites or Sommerfeld Mennonite Church, are a subgroup of the so-called Russian Mennonites that took this name in Canada in 1894, coming originally from the Bergthal Colony in the Russian Empire. Many of them left Canada for Latin America starting in the early 1920s. They now live in Canada, Mexico, Paraguay and Bolivia.

In 1985 they had a total population of about 5,400 people in Manitoba and Saskatchewan in Canada and in 1987 they had 10 colonies in Latin America with a total population of about 7,500 people.

See also

 Evangelical Mennonite Mission Conference

References

Canadian diaspora in North America
Canadian diaspora in South America
Mennonite congregations
Mennonitism in Bolivia
Mennonitism in Paraguay
Russian Mennonite diaspora in Belize
Russian Mennonite diaspora in Canada
Russian Mennonite diaspora in Manitoba
Russian Mennonite diaspora in Mexico